DBI may refer to:

dBi, decibel isotropic
DBI (gene), the gene encoding diazepam binding inhibitor in humans
DBI Beverage, a subsidiary of Ingram Entertainment
DBI, a company founded by David Belt which now operates as DBI Projects and DBI Construction Consultants
Beck Depression Inventory, a psychological test used to measure depression levels
Dahabshil Bank International, Somalia
Data Bus Inversion - a method of power saving in DDR4
Davies–Bouldin index, a metric for evaluating clustering algorithms
Davie-Brown Index, an independent index for brand marketers
Delaware Biotechnology Institute, University of Delaware, U.S.
Dizionario Biografico degli Italiani, the Biographical Dictionary of the Italians
Doppelgänger brand image, Doublewalker in marketing
Dubai, a city in the United Arab Emirates
Dynamic binary instrumentation, a technique to change programs
ISO 639:dbi or Doka, a Plateau language of Nigeria
Perl DBI, a database interface for Perl
Phenformin, by the trade name DBI